Bristow Helicopters Limited is a British civil helicopter operator originally based at Aberdeen Airport, Scotland, which is currently a part of the U.S.-based Bristow Group (S&P 600 component) which in turn has its corporate headquarters in Houston, Texas, U.S.  In 2020, Bristow Group was merged with Era Helicopters, a large U.S.-based commercial helicopter operator that was previously a division of Era Aviation, with the two companies then continuing to use the Bristow name.

Bristow Helicopters was established by Alan Bristow in June 1955; two years later, it acquired its first pair of helicopters in the form of the Westland Widgeon. The company quickly expanded overseas as well as various services, including helicopter training, oil exploration, search and rescue, and charter flights. Having entered the African market in 1960, Nigeria became Bristow's biggest profit centre during the 1970s. Entering the North Sea market, also during the 1960s, Bristow became Aberdeen Airport's largest single employer during the 1980s and was operating the majority of offshore flights in the North Sea. The company went through repeated changes in ownership during the 1980s and 1990s, leading to its acquisition by American helicopter operator Offshore Logistics in 1996, which re-branded itself as The Bristow Group in February 2006.

Bristow Helicopters Limited holds a United Kingdom Civil Aviation Authority Type A Operating Licence, it is permitted to carry passengers, cargo and mail on aircraft with  20 seats or more.<ref>"Operating Licence Holders." Civil Aviation Authority, Retrieved: 9 February 2020.</ref>  The U.S. division of Bristow is a Federal Aviation Administration (FAA) approved Part 135 air carrier. On 11 May 2019, Bristow Group entered Chapter 11 bankruptcy protection, affecting North America operations, but leaving overseas operations unchanged. After an aggressive expansion earlier in the decade, demand was cut back as crude oil prices dropped and Bristow Group's total debt stood at $1.44 billion by 30 September 2018. Bristow completed the UK's Eastern Airways sale on 10 May, and still wants to sell its interest in Australia's Airnorth, hoping for $230 million combined.

HistoryBristow Helicopters Limited traces its origins back to the endeavours of British inventor and business man Alan Bristow. A former test pilot for both the Royal Navy and Westland Helicopters, Bristow had chosen to invest his earnings into forming multiple companies, the first of which being Air Whaling Ltd. In June 1955, he opted to establish Bristow Helicopters Limited after securing a contract for the supply of helicopter crews at the Shell Oil Company to support rigs in the Persian Gulf. During 1957, Bristow Helicopters received a contract from British Petroleum, which allowed the firm to purchase its own helicopters, a pair of Westland Widgeons. That same year, having realised that few companies could afford helicopter services, Bristow began to seek work around the globe; the company soon launched successful ventures into both Iran and Bolivia.

In 1960, Bristow Helicopters chose to enter the African market via the acquisition of crop-spraying specialist Fison-Airwork, which had also operated in locations in Central America and the UK. Bristow opted to discontinue crop-spraying activities in favour of focusing on oil exploration work in Nigeria on behalf of Shell; by the start of the Biafran War in 1967, the company had a fleet of 11 helicopters committed the Nigerian oil exploration effort, based at Port Harcourt. Early on in the conflict, Bristow helped to evacuate oil workers in the region to the safety of Fernando Po; despite the risks, Bristow maintained its Nigerian operations throughout the three years of war via a reduced presence in Lagos and Warri. This decision to remain gave the company a head-start on rivals as oil companies returned to the region after the war's end. Throughout much of 1970s, Nigeria functioned as Bristow's biggest profit centre; it continued to grow through the decade via contracts from Shell, Mobil, Texaco and other companies.

In the mid-1960s, Bristow opted to enter the North Sea market; being the second helicopter operator (after BEA Helicopters Limited) to establish operations at Aberdeen, Scotland, it was relatively well positioned to take advantage of the region's oil boom. Starting on 17 February 1965, the company operated the Westland Wessex 60 ten-seat helicopter to support these off-shore installations. Throughout the 1970s, Bristow would expand its Aberdeen operation, its main oil and gas support hub being based at Dyce Airport; in 1972, the company allocated the first of several Sikorsky S-61N to Sumburgh Airport in support of Shell's offshore rigs. Following an expansion programme, which included the building of new on-site accommodations for workers and their families, around thirty S-61N flights were routinely flying daily from Sumburgh, supported by round-the-clock maintenance coverage, at the peak of operations during the 1970s. During the 1980s, Bristow became Aberdeen Airport's largest single employer, its personnel in Aberdeen having increased a hundred-fold, as well as operating the majority of offshore flights in the North Sea. In 1980 alone, nearly 400,000 passengers and over 2,300 tons of freight passed through Bristow's Aberdeen terminal.

Another key source of business was the provision of training services; in 1961, Bristow Helicopters commenced training of helicopter pilots on behalf of the Royal Navy at Redhill Aerodrome, Surrey; further training contracts were quickly secured from other helicopter operators in India, Australia and New Zealand. By 1970, Bristow had also established a training joint venture in Iran, although this was discontinued after the Iranian Revolution of 1979. During the late 1960s, Bristow Helicopters operated a fleet of Hiller UH-12 training helicopters based at AAC Middle Wallop which were used to train flight crews on behalf of the UK Army Air Corps. In 1986, the company began training overseas pilots at its flying school at Redhill Aerodrome; this program ran for multiple decades, being rebranded as the Bristow Academy. In addition to pilot training, Bristow has also been involved in training ground crew, having started sponsoring students at the Nigerian College of Aviation Technology, (NCAT), Zaria, in 1986.

Starting in 1971, Bristow Helicopters began providing civilian search and rescue (SAR) services in the UK, replacing military Westland Whirlwinds with Bristow-operated Sikorsky S-55s at RAF Manston, Kent. The then-unfamiliar concept of using a private company for SAR services led to a public outcry and intense lobbying efforts thus, after three years, operations were turned back over to RAF Coastal Command. Bristow reentered the UK's SAR sector in 1983 when it commenced operations on behalf of the Maritime and Coastguard Agency (MCA) from Sumburgh Airport; the company held the contract until 2007 and secured it again in June 2013. Other locations, including Stornoway, Lee-on-Solent, and Portland, would also be operated by Bristow on behalf of MCA. Over the years, Bristow's SAR units have responded to multiple incidents, including rescue efforts in the recovery of survivors of the Piper Alpha disaster.

During the early 1970s, the backbone of Bristow's fleet consisted of the Westland Wessex, Westland Whirlwind, and Bell 206, along with a handful of other types, including several fixed-wing Britten-Norman BN-2 Islanders. By the 1980s, Bristow had entirely phased out the Wessexes; the bulk of its fleet came to consist of Bell 206s, Bell 212s, and Sikorsky S-76s, amongst other types, during this period. Bristow was in fact the first European operator to adopt the Sikorsky S-76 into commercial service. The company also played a leading role in the development of the Aérospatiale Super Puma, having consulted with Aerospatiale to shape its design for the oil and gas market, branding it "Tiger" rather than "Super Puma" for its own fleet. Bristow decided to place a larger order for 35 Super Pumas, or "Tigers", this being the largest civil helicopter order to have been made at the time; the first examples of the type were introduced in early 1982.

 
Within the company's first three decades, Bristow Helicopters had expanded into the provision of various helicopter-based services, including the provision of pilot training, search and rescue coverage, cargo transportation, and charter flights, in addition to its more traditional helicopter transport services. The business had also developed a worldwide presence within a similar timeframe, providing its services in the North Sea, Middle East, South America, Africa, Asia, India, Bermuda, Trinidad, Australia and New Zealand.

The company went through repeated changes in ownership during the 1980s and 1990s. In 1985, Bristow Helicopters was acquired by British and Commonwealth Holdings plc. That same year, Alan Bristow stood down from his active role in managing the company. It was soon sold on as a component of the Bricom Group via a management buy-out in 1988. In July 1990, Bricom was acquired by Scandinavian investment company Rochfield. In 1991, Bristow Helicopters was subject to another management buy-out headed by managing director and chief executive Bryan Collins.

In 1996, Bristow Helicopters was purchased by Offshore Logistics, an American offshore helicopter operator which previously operated as Air Logistics in the U.S. Gulf of Mexico and Alaska, and was structured as a reverse takeover. The group operates and maintains a global fleet of over 400 aircraft. In February 2006, Offshore Logistics decided to re-brand itself as The Bristow Group. In January 2010, Bristow announced the retirement of the Air Logistics name and Gulf of Mexico operations would operate under the name Bristow.

The Bristow Group expanded their portfolio in April 2007 with the purchase of Helicopter Adventures, a Florida-based flight school, Helicopter Adventures was subsequently renamed Bristow Academy.Smith, Dale. "Training Profile: Bristow Academy" page 27-31. Rotor&Wing, July 2011. The deal also provided the Bristow Group with the world's largest civilian fleet of Schweizer aircraft.

Current operations
Joint ventures
In addition to its wholly owned international operations, Bristow Group maintains service agreements and equity interests in helicopter operators in Brazil, Canada, Colombia, Egypt, Kazakhstan, Turkmenistan, Mexico, Norway and Russia (Sakhalin) and the United Kingdom. This allows Bristow to extend its range of services into new and developing oil and gas markets and helps provide a lower cost structure in some operating areas. Partners include:

 Cougar Helicopters
 Helicopteros Nacionales de Colombia, Helicol S.A., Colombia
 Petroleum Air Services, Egypt
 Atyrau Bristow Airways Services (ABAS), Kazakhstan
 Turkmenistan Helicopters Limited, Turkmenistan
 Heliservicio Campeche, Mexico
 Norsk Helikopter, Norway - now Bristow Norway
 Sakhalin Bristow Air Services AKA Aviashelf, Sakhalin, Russia
 FBH Limited, UK

Fixed Wing
Bristow has controlling interests in Eastern Airways which is a regional airline based in the U.K. operating fixed wing regional jet and turboprop aircraft and Airnorth, also a regional airline, based in Australia operating fixed wing regional jet and turboprop aircraft. Both Eastern Airways and Airnorth operate scheduled passenger services, shuttle flights for oil and gas industry personnel, and charter services.

Although not a joint venture, in 2015 Bristow and AgustaWestland agreed to develop offshore and search and rescue capabilities for the AW609 tiltrotor. This could simplify a typical trip from Clapham Common to an oil rig by using just one aircraft. Bristow intends to order more than 10 tiltrotors.

Search and Rescue

Bristow helicopters operated Sikorsky S-61N helicopters on behalf of His Majesty's Coastguard, the United Kingdom's coastguard, until July 2007 after which there was a 12-month transitional period whilst CHC Helicopter took over the contract replacing the S-61N with new helicopters.

Bristow operated four dedicated Search and Rescue (SAR) sites in the UK, on behalf of HM Coastguard. The units were located at Portland (EGDP) and Lee-on-Solent (EGHF) on the south coast of England, at Stornoway (EGPO) in the Outer Hebrides, and at Sumburgh (EGPB) in the Shetland Isles.

Northern North Sea services operated from Aberdeen (EGPD), Scatsta (EGPM) and Stavanger (ENZV).

Southern North Sea services operate from Norwich (EGSH), Humberside (EGNJ) and Den Helder (EHKD) with its support organisation based at Redhill (EGKR).

Bristow S-61N's were responsible to carry out SAR tasks, operating from Den Helder Airport on behalf of the oil and gas industry.

On 26 March 2013, Bristow was awarded a 10-year contract to operate the search and rescue operations in the United Kingdom, at the time being provided by CHC Helicopter (on behalf of HM Coastguard), the Royal Air Force and the Royal Navy. Bristow is currently operating AgustaWestland AW189 and Sikorsky S-92 helicopters in support of this contract.

Fleet

Bristow operates a large fleet of over 450 helicopters and aircraft, which includes unconsolidated affiliates and joint venture partners. Bristow intends to reduce fleet variety from 24 helicopter types to six. For subsidiary Airnorth fixed wing jet and turboprop aircraft, see Airnorth.

Incidents
 On 4 April 1967, 5N-ABQ, a Scottish Aviation Twin Pioneer Series 1, crashed in Nigeria during a single engine approach.
 On 13 August 1981, G-ASWI, a Westland Wessex 60 helicopter lost power to the main rotor gearbox, going out of control during the ensuing autorotation. The flight was carrying 11 gas workers from the Leman gas field to Bacton, Norfolk. All people on board were lost.http://www.aaib.gov.uk/cms_resources/4%2D1983%20G%2DASWI%20Append%2Epdf 4/1983 Westland Wessex 60, G-ASWI Appendices
 On 14 September 1982, G-BDIL, a Bell 212, crashed into the North Sea near the Murchison oil platform while on a nighttime search and rescue mission.
 On 4 July 1983, G-TIGD, an Aerospatiale AS332L Super Puma crashed on landing at Aberdeen. During the approach to Aberdeen from the North Hutton platform, a loud bang was heard, followed by severe vibration. A PAN call was made to ATC by the crew. Shortly before landing control was lost and the helicopter struck the runway heavily on its side. 10 of 16 passengers received serious injuries. A tail boom panel had become detached in flight and damaged all five tail rotor blades. The resulting imbalance to the tail rotor assembly led to the separation of this unit and subsequent loss of control.
 In 1984, G-BJJR, a Bell 212, crashed with the loss of two crew on approach to the Cecil Provine.
 On 5 December 1991, VR-BIG, an Aerospatiale SA-330J Puma, ditched in Mermaid Sound, Dampier, Western Australia, after a pick-up from departing LNG tanker in night VFR conditions, entered a vortex ring state. After ditching, it stayed afloat for over two hours.
 On 14 March 1992, G-TIGH, a Bristow's Tiger (Aerospatiale Super Puma), lost altitude and crashed while ferrying passengers from the Cormorant Alpha to the flotel Safe Supporter. Of the two crew and 14 passengers on board, one crew member and ten passengers were lost.
 On 19 January 1995, G-TIGK, an AS-332L Super Puma helicopter on Bristow Flight 56C between Aberdeen and oil rigs in the North Sea, was struck by lightning. The flight was carrying 16 oil workers from Aberdeen to an oil platform at the Brae oilfield. All people on board survived.
 On 16 July 2002, G-BJVX, a Sikorsky S-76A helicopter operated by Norwich-based Bristow Helicopters, crashed into the southern North Sea while it was making a ten-minute flight between the gas production platform Clipper and the drilling rig Global Santa Fe Monarch, after which it was to return to Norwich Airport. The 22-year-old helicopter was flying at an altitude of about  when workers on the Global Santa Fe Monarch heard "a loud bang". Witnesses watched the rotorcraft steeply dive into the sea; one also reported seeing the helicopter's rotor head with rotor blades attached falling into the sea after the body of the helicopter had impacted. The accident caused the death of all those on board (two crew members and nine Shell workers as passengers). The body of the eleventh man was never recovered.
 On 22 November 2006, G-JSAR, a Eurocopter Super Puma SAR ditched in the North Sea. G-JSAR was operated from Den Helder Airport in the Netherlands on behalf of oil companies. All on board survived uninjured.
The helicopter was five minutes away from landing at the Muritala Muhammed airport in Lagos. Four oil workers and the two crew died while six others were rescued alive.

See also
Whirlwind (novel) - A novel by James Clavell, first published in 1986, which was closely inspired by the true struggle of Bristow Helicopters to escape the revolutionary forces and get their employees and equipment out of the unstable, deteriorating situation in Iran. Much of the story mirrors these and other contemporary events.
Bristow Norway - (formerly Norsk Helikopter) is a Norwegian helicopter company that transports crew to oil installations in the North Sea.
Petroleum Helicopters International

References

Further reading

External links

 
Bristow sites:
Bristow Group
Bristow Search and Rescue
Bristow page at Helicopter History site

 
1953 establishments in Scotland
Airlines established in 1953
Airlines of the United Kingdom
Companies listed on the New York Stock Exchange
Helicopter airlines
British companies established in 1953